McKenzie Cantrell (born July 17, 1987) is an American politician who previously served in the Kentucky House of Representatives from the 38th district from January 3, 2017, to January 1, 2023.

References

1987 births
Living people
Democratic Party members of the Kentucky House of Representatives
21st-century American politicians
21st-century American women politicians
Women state legislators in Kentucky